The following article is a summary of the 2018–19 football season in Belgium, which is the 116th season of competitive football in the country and runs from July 2018 until June 2019.

National teams

Belgium national football team 

Following the success at the 2018 FIFA World Cup, Belgium was expected to perform well in the inaugural UEFA Nations League competition but collapsed in their final match against Switzerland, losing 5–2 despite a 0–2 lead, to miss out on the Nations League Finals. The UEFA Euro 2020 qualifying Group I campaign was however started with four straight wins.

2018–19 UEFA Nations League A

Group 3

UEFA Euro 2020 qualifying

Friendlies

Men's football

League season

Promotion and relegation
The following teams had achieved promotion or suffered relegation going into the 2018–19 season.

Belgian First Division A

Regular season

Championship play-offs

Belgian First Division B

Belgian First Amateur Division

Belgian Second Amateur Division

Division A

Division B

Division C

Belgian Third Amateur Division

Division A

Division B

Division C

Division D

Cup competitions

Transfers

UEFA competitions
Champions Club Brugge qualified directly for the group stage of the Champions League, while runners-up Standard Liège started in the qualifying rounds. As Standard Liège also had won the Belgian Cup, third placed Anderlecht qualified directly for the group stage of the Europa League, while Gent and Genk started in the qualifying rounds.

European qualification for 2019–20 summary

Managerial changes
This is a list of changes of managers within Belgian professional league football (Belgian First Division A and Belgian First Division B):

Notes

See also
 2018–19 Belgian First Division A
 2018–19 Belgian First Division B
 2018–19 Belgian First Amateur Division
 2018–19 Belgian Second Amateur Division
 2018–19 Belgian Third Amateur Division
 2018–19 Belgian Cup
 2018 Belgian Super Cup

References

 
Belgium
Belgium